Steenerson Township is a township in Beltrami County, Minnesota, United States. The population was 28 as of the 2000 census.

Steenerson Township was named for Halvor Steenerson, a member of the U.S. House of Representatives from Minnesota's 9th district.

Geography
According to the United States Census Bureau, the township has a total area of 36.3 square miles (94.0 km), all land.

Unincorporated town
 Thorhult at 
(This list is based on USGS data and may include former settlements.)

Major highway
  Minnesota State Highway 89

Adjacent townships
 Minnie Township (north)
 Hamre Township (west)
 Spruce Grove Township (northwest)

Cemeteries
The township contains Rosebud Cemetery.

Demographics
As of the census of 2000, there were 28 people, 11 households, and 8 families residing in the township. The population density was 0.8 people per square mile (0.3/km). There were 28 housing units at an average density of 0.8/sq mi (0.3/km). The racial makeup of the township was 89.29% White, 3.57% African American and 7.14% Native American.

There were 11 households, out of which 18.2% had children under the age of 18 living with them, 63.6% were married couples living together, 9.1% had a female householder with no husband present, and 18.2% were non-families. 18.2% of all households were made up of individuals, and 9.1% had someone living alone who was 65 years of age or older. The average household size was 2.55 and the average family size was 2.67.

In the township the population was spread out, with 17.9% under the age of 18, 7.1% from 18 to 24, 14.3% from 25 to 44, 39.3% from 45 to 64, and 21.4% who were 65 years of age or older. The median age was 55 years. For every 100 females, there were 100.0 males. For every 100 females age 18 and over, there were 155.6 males.

The median income for a household in the township was $13,750, and the median income for a family was $12,500. Males had a median income of $38,750 versus $6,250 for females. The per capita income for the township was $10,075. None of the population and none of the families were below the poverty line.

References
 United States National Atlas
 United States Census Bureau 2007 TIGER/Line Shapefiles
 United States Board on Geographic Names (GNIS)

Townships in Beltrami County, Minnesota
Townships in Minnesota